Peter Heenan,  (February 19, 1875 – May 12, 1948) was a Canadian union leader and politician, and also served as a cabinet minister at the federal and provincial levels.

Early life

Born in Tullaree, near Newcastle, County Down, Ireland, Heenan worked as a pit boy at St Helen's Colliery in Cumberland, where he tested work on the mine's railways, and then worked on the Costa Rica Railway in Central America. An attack of yellow fever forced Heenan to move to Canada in 1902, where he first worked on a Western ranch, and then as a locomotive engineer for the Canadian Pacific Railway on the run between Winnipeg and Kenora. The experience he had acquired in Costa Rica as a diver also proved useful when he was called to help out in a train wreck just outside Kenora, where the locomotive had plunged down underwater.

Heenan became involved in the labour movement in Northwestern Ontario, becoming its most prominent leader by the beginning of World War I. He also became an alderman on Kenora's town council, serving for five years, and was also chairman of the local public utilities commission for two years.

Political career

Labour MPP in Ontario (1919-1926)

Elected to the Legislative Assembly of Ontario as the Labour candidate for the riding of Kenora in the 1919 election, Heenan was re-elected in 1923. When the Legislature was not in session, he would resume driving locomotives.

Under Heenan's leadership, the Labour MPPs joined with the United Farmers of Ontario to form a coalition government under E.C. Drury, with the understanding that Drury would support Edward Wellington Backus' plans for erecting a newsprint mill in Kenora. Heenan was also instrumental in getting Harry Mills appointed as the Province's first Minister of Mines.

Liberal MP and federal Minister of Labour (1926-1934)

He was elected as the Liberal candidate to the House of Commons of Canada representing the riding of Kenora—Rainy River in the 1925 federal election. He was re-elected in 1926 and 1930. From 1926 to 1930, he was the Minister of Labour, and became known as "Peter the Peacemaker" for settling 160 labour disputes in his first three years. He secured the passage of the Mother's Allowance Act and the Old Age Pensions Act.

Heenan still found time to work as a locomotive engineer when the House was not in session. In 1934, during a debate, he exclaimed, "I wanted to be unique. I wanted to be the only man that the Conservatives have put into overalls."

Liberal MPP and Ontario Cabinet Minister (1934-1943)

Heenan resigned his federal seat, after winning a provincial seat as the Liberal Party of Ontario candidate in the 1934 election for the riding of Kenora. He was re-elected in 1937. From 1934 to 1941, he was the Minister of Lands and Forests in the provincial government of Mitchell Hepburn. Heenan was charged with promoting Hepburn's policies on natural resource development, including the aggressive position with respect to timber licenses in Northern Ontario that were being held by companies that would not (or could not) cut wood on them. In that regard, in 1936 the Forest Resources Regulation Act was passed that granted the government broad powers for mandating minimum production quotas, maximum limits in line with good forestry practice, reducing licensed acreages where they were in excess of requirements, and increasing stumpage fees on companies "operating or carrying on business in a manner detrimental to the public interest."

He also sought to exploit other uses for provincial lands.

The 1938 collapse of the Lake Sulphite Pulp Company's operation at Red Rock led to Opposition charges of ineptness in the policies of the Department of Lands and Forests. Following hearings by a legislative committee in the matter, Heenan and his deputy minister tendered their resignations. He was subsequently appointed as provincial Minister of Labour.

Heenan took good care of his constituents' interests, and arranged for many improvements for Northwestern Ontario, including the construction of the Heenan Highway (now Highway 71) to serve Kenora and Rainy River.

Further reading

References

External links
 
 
 

1875 births
1948 deaths
Irish emigrants to Canada (before 1923)
Labour MPPs in Ontario
Liberal Party of Canada MPs
Members of the Executive Council of Ontario
Members of the House of Commons of Canada from Ontario
Members of the King's Privy Council for Canada
Ontario Liberal Party MPPs
People from Kenora District
Politicians from County Down
British expatriates in Costa Rica